Brush Mountain may refer to:

United States
The USGS Geographical Names Information System lists 35 summits, including:

Other countries
 Brush Mountain (Alberta) in Alberta, Canada